The Taj Express was started in 1964 to serve tourists traveling from Delhi to Agra. It reduced the traveling time from over three hours to around two and a half hours. It was a very popular train especially among foreign tourists, before the Bhopal Shatabdi was introduced in 1988. The train was later extended up to Gwalior, then to Jhansi in 2006. It was named after Taj Mahal

History
Running at 105 km/h, it brought down travel time on this route to 2h 35m. It was hauled by a WP-7003 steam engine. It was a train that was immensely popular with tourists, particularly foreigners, as it gave them ample time to visit the Taj Mahal and neighbouring monuments before returning to Delhi that evening. It was posted on Facebook page of Ministry of Railways, Government of India (Facebook confirmed that this is the authentic profile for this public figure.) on 1st October 2022: On this day in 1964, Taj Express, the then fastest train on the Indian Railways Network was introduced between New Delhi and Agra Cantt.
Surprisingly, the train did not run on Wednesdays. The Taj Mahal monument was then closed to tourists on Mondays  and the one day off on Wednesdays was a direct financial loss. The Archaeological Survey of India then decided that the Taj Mahal would remain closed on Fridays for the public except for Muslims who could pray in the mosque between 12 noon to 2 P.M. The Taj Express still did not operate on Wednesdays.
In Oct, 1982 The Taj Express began using diesel locomotives (WDM-2).
In 1985, then-Railway Minister Madhavrao Scindia extended the Taj Express to Gwalior Junction. Journey time was 5hrs 20 min, leaving Hazrat Nizamuddin at 0710 am and reaching Gwalior at 1230 pm. The return timings were 1710 pm departure Gwalior and 2230 pm arrival Hazrat Nizamuddin. In 1989, the Wednesdays off was discontinued. The train, however, remained idle for well over four hours at Gwalior.
In 1986 The Taj Express began using electric locomotives.
1 July 2006, the train was extended to Jhansi.
4 January 2016, the train introduced LHB coach.
21 February 2018, the source for 12280 and destination station of 12279, changed from Hazrat Nizamuddin (NZM) to New Delhi (NDLS).

Train Info

Route
The train numbered 12279 goes from Gwalior Junctionto New Delhi railway station, and train number is 12280 goes from New Delhi railway station to Gwalior.

Locomotive
As the whole route is electrified the train is generally hauled by WAP-7 from Ghaziabad for its whole journey. But occasionally it is also hauled by WAP-5 from Ghaziabad.

See also

List of named passenger trains of India
Bhopal Shatabdi
Bhopal Express
Indian Railways coaching stock

References

External links
http://www.irfca.org/faq/faq-history5.html
http://www.nr.indianrail.gov.in/scripts/static/RecentReleasesDisplay_h.aspx?id=1389
History of Taj Express

Express trains in India
Rail transport in Madhya Pradesh
Trains from Jhansi
Rail transport in Delhi
Transport in Delhi
Railway services introduced in 1964
1964 establishments in Delhi
Named passenger trains of India
1964 establishments in Uttar Pradesh